These are the official results of the women's shot put event at the 1997 IAAF World Championships in Athens, Greece. There were a total number of 25 participating athletes, with the final held on Thursday, August 7, 1997. The qualification mark was set at 19.00 metres.

Medalists

Schedule
All times are Eastern European Time (UTC+2)

Abbreviations
All results shown are in metres

Records

Qualification

Group A

Group B

Final

See also
 1996 Women's Olympic Shot Put
 1997 Shot Put Year Ranking

References
 Results

s
Shot put at the World Athletics Championships
1997 in women's athletics